The Palm Bowl was the name of the NCAA Division II Football Championship played at McAllen Veterans Memorial Stadium in McAllen, Texas from 1981 to 1985. The championship was moved to Braly Municipal Stadium in Florence, Alabama in 1986.

Game results

References

External links
 NCAA Division II National Football Championship history

Defunct college football bowls
McAllen, Texas
NCAA Division II Football Championship
1981 establishments in Texas
1985 disestablishments in Texas
Recurring sporting events established in 1981
Recurring sporting events disestablished in 1985